Marcelo Jesús Goux (born 21 September 1975 in Lanús) is a former Argentine football defender who plays for Gimnasia La Plata.

Career

Goux started his professional playing career with Huracán on 11 August 1996 in a 2–1 defeat to Ferro Carril Oeste. After a brief stint with Club Nacional de Football of Uruguay he returned to Argentina to play for Colón de Santa Fe.

In 2000, he joined Belgrano de Córdoba and in 2002 he joined Gimnasia La Plata where he played 167 league games, he left the club after claims that some Gimnasia fans had made death threats against their own players in order to make them lose a game in order to damage the title chances of local rival Estudiantes de La Plata. He rejoined Colón de Santa Fe in 2007. He retired from active football soccer on June 30, 2012.

Personal
His younger brother, Luciano Goux is also a football player.

References

External links
 Guardian statistics

 Argentine Primera statistics

1975 births
Living people
Sportspeople from Lanús
Argentine footballers
Association football defenders
Club Atlético Huracán footballers
Club Atlético Colón footballers
Club Atlético Belgrano footballers
Club de Gimnasia y Esgrima La Plata footballers
Club Nacional de Football players
Argentine Primera División players
Argentine expatriate footballers
Expatriate footballers in Uruguay
Argentine people of French descent